Aeëtes, or Aeeta, was a king of Colchis in Greek mythology. The name comes from the ancient Greek word  ("eagle").

Family 
Aeëtes was the son of Sun god Helios and the Oceanid Perseis, brother of Circe, Perses and Pasiphaë, and father of Medea, Chalciope and Absyrtus. His consort was either (1) Idyia, the youngest daughter of Oceanus, (2) Asterodeia, a Caucasian Oceanid, (3) the Nereid Neaera, (4) Clytia, (5) Ipsia or Eurylyte.

According to others, he was the brother of Perses, a king of Tauris, husband of his niece Hecate, and father of Medea, Chalciope and Absyrtus. Yet other versions make Aeëtes a native of Corinth and son of Ephyra, an Oceanid, or else of a certain Antiope. Asterope was also one of the possible mothers of Aeëtes.

Mythology

Foundation of Colchis 
Pausanias states that, according to the poet Eumelos, Aeëtes was the son of Helios (from northern Peloponnesus) and brother of Aloeus. Helios divided the land he ruled, and he gave Aloeus the part in Asopia (see Asopus) and Aeëtes the part of Ephyra (Corinth). Later, Aeëtes gave his kingdom to Bounos, a son of Hermes and Alkidameia, and went to Colchis, a country in western Caucasus. When Bounos died, Epopeus, a son of Aloeus who ruled in Asopia, became king of Ephyra too. Aeëtes built a new colony in Colchis, near the mouth of the large river Phasis, and called it Aea.

Flight of two siblings 
Phrixus, son of Athamas and Nephele, along with his twin, Helle, were hated by their stepmother, Ino. Ino hatched a devious plot to get rid of the twins, roasting all the town's crop seeds so they would not grow. The local farmers, frightened of famine, asked a nearby oracle for assistance. Ino bribed the men sent to the oracle to lie and tell the others that the oracle required the sacrifice of Phrixus but before they were able to kill him, Phrixus and Helle were rescued by a golden ram sent by Nephele, their natural mother. Helle fell off the ram into the Hellespont (which was named after her) and died, but Phrixus survived all the way to Colchis, where Aeëtes took him in and treated him kindly, giving Phrixus his daughter Chalciope in marriage. In gratitude, Phrixus gave the king the golden fleece of the ram, which Aeëtes hung on a tree in his kingdom. Aeëtes dedicated the golden fleece to Ares. Phrixus thus lived at the court of Aeëtes for a long time but one day Aeëtes learned from an oracle that he would die at the hands of a descendant of Aeolus and so he killed Phryxus. His sons, on the other hand, managed to return to Orchomenus.

The Argonauts
Some time later, Jason arrived to claim the fleece as his own. Aeëtes promised to give it to him only if he could perform certain tasks. First, Jason had to plow a field with fire-breathing oxen that he had to yoke himself. Then, Jason sowed into a field the teeth of a dragon which the Colchian king received from Athena, half of it was sowed before by Cadmus in Thebes. These teeth sprouted into an army of warriors. Jason was quick-thinking, however, and before they attacked him, he threw a rock into the crowd. Unable to determine whence the rock had come, the soldiers killed each other. Jason then ran away. Medea fled, too. Aeëtes pursued them in his own ship as they fled, but Medea distracted her father by killing and dismembering her brother, Absyrtus, and throwing pieces of his cadaver overboard. Aeëtes paused to gather the pieces of his son, and thus Jason and Medea escaped.

Historicity 
The mythical Aeetes may have reflected a memory of a historical personage. His name recurs in historical narratives of Classical authors who claim the enduring legacy of Aeëtes in Colchis. Arrian, touring the region in the 2nd century, reports seeing sites and ruins from Aeetes' time. The 5th-century author Zosimus mentions "a palace of Aeetes" standing at the mouth of the Phasis. Local rulers are claimed to have descended from Aeëtes, such as a king of the Phasians from Xenophon's Anabasis and Saulaces, a gold-rich king of Colchis, from Pliny the Elder's Naturalis Historia. Strabo, who treated Aeetes as a historical person, writes that this was "a local name among the Colchians". The name of Aeëtes was borne by a historical Colchian, a 6th-century nobleman in Lazica in the times of Lazic War known from Agathias's account. If naming Aeëtes as the ancestor of the Colchian rulers was not the invention of the classical authors, it is possible that the Colchian rulers regarded themselves as descendants of Aeetes.

Notes

References
 Argonautica Orphica, 760–1044.
 Apollonius Rhodius. Argonautica, 3. 240–4. 131.
 Scholia on Argonautica, 3. 242
 Bibliotheca 1. 9. 23.
 Pausanias. Description of Greece, 2. 3. 10.
 Strabo. Geographica, 1,45.
 Smith, William; Dictionary of Greek and Roman Biography and Mythology, London (1873). "Periphas 5."

External links

Mythological kings of Colchis
Kings in Greek mythology
Children of Helios
Demigods in classical mythology
Metamorphoses characters
Characters in the Argonautica
Corinthian characters in Greek mythology
Fictional people from Georgia (country)